Anca is a Romanian-language female given name and a surname. Notable persons with that name include:

Persons with the given name
Anca Barna (born 1977), German tennis player
Anca Boagiu (born 1968), Romanian engineer and politician
Anca Dragu (born 1972), Romanian economist and politician
Anca Grigoraș (born 1957), Romanian artistic gymnast
Anca Heltne (born 1978), Romanian shot putter
Anca Mateescu (born 1981), Mexican canoeist
Anca Măroiu (born 1983), Romanian épée fencer 
Anca Parghel (1957–2008), Romanian jazz artist
Anca Pătrășcoiu (born 1967), Romanian swimmer
Anca Petrescu (1949–2013), Romanian architect and politician
Anca Tănase (born 1968), Romanian rower
Anca Stoean Babarus (born 1961), Romanian AG
Anca Pop (1984-2018), Romanian-Canadian singer-songwriter
Anca Popescu (born 1976), Romanian volleyball player
Anca Giurchescu (1930-2015), Romanian researcher of folk dance and founder of ethnochoreologist
Anca Verma (born 1987), Romanian supermodel, former Miss Romania, and wife of arms dealer Abhishek Verma

Persons with the surname
Adrian Anca (born 1976), Romanian footballer
Mircea Anca (born 1960), Romanian film actor and director

Surname
 Ancuța, diminutive of Anca
 Bianca

Romanian feminine given names
Romanian-language surnames